Face of a Fighter is an album by country singer Willie Nelson. It was recorded in 1961 but released in 1978 when Nelson founded his own label company, Lone Star Records.

Track listing 
"Face of a Fighter"
"Shelter of Your Arms"
"End of Understanding"
"Is There Something on Your Mind"
"Some Other Time"
"Will You Remember Mine"
"Everything But You"
"I Hope So"
"A Moment Isn't Very Long"
"Blame It on the Times"

Personnel 
Willie Nelson – Vocals, Guitar.

References

1978 compilation albums
Willie Nelson compilation albums